A Love Story (French: Une histoire d'amour) is a 1933 French historical drama film directed by Max Ophüls and starring Abel Tarride, Magda Schneider and Simone Héliard, based on Arthur Schnitzler's 1896 play Liebelei about a musician's daughter in 1890s Imperial Vienna who falls in love with a young army officer, only for him to be killed in a duel.

It is a French-language version of Liebelei with several of the same actors. It was made at the Joinville Studios in Paris.

Cast
 Abel Tarride as Le vieux Weyring, musicien  
 Magda Schneider as Christine Weyring  
 Simone Héliard as Mizzi Schlager  
 Gustaf Gründgens as Baron von Eggersdorf  
 Olga Tschechowa as Baronin von Eggersdorf 
 George Rigaud as Lieutenant Théodore Berg  
 Wolfgang Liebeneiner as Sous-lieutenant Fritz Lobheimer 
 Georges Mauloy as Colonel  
 Paul Otto as Major von Eggersdorf  
 Pierre Stéphen as Binder, musicien  
 André Dubosc as Le concierge du théâtre

References

Bibliography 
 Alpi, Deborah Lazaroff. Robert Siodmak: A Biography, with Critical Analyses of His Films Noirs and a Filmography of All His Works. McFarland, 1998. 
 White, Susan M. The Cinema of Max Ophuls: Magisterial Vision and the Figure of Woman. Columbia University Press, 1995.

External links 
 

1933 films
French historical drama films
1930s historical drama films
1930s French-language films
Films directed by Max Ophüls
Films set in Vienna
Films set in the 1890s
French films based on plays
Films based on works by Arthur Schnitzler
French multilingual films
Films shot at Joinville Studios
French black-and-white films
1933 multilingual films
1933 drama films
1930s French films